Timothy Eugene Legler (born December 26, 1966) is an American former professional basketball player who played in the National Basketball Association (NBA). He is currently an ESPN basketball analyst and co-host/analyst on SiriusXM NBA Radio.

College career

Legler attended La Salle University, where he became an Academic All-American and scored 1,699 career points in four seasons for the men's basketball team. He was named to the First Team All-Big 5 (1987) and All-MAAC teams (1987 and 1988). Legler's 3.40 GPA earned him a place on the 1988 GTE Academic All-American Team. He was a career 43 percent three-point shooter. Legler led La Salle to the 1987 National Invitation Tournament championship game at Madison Square Garden as well as the 1988 NCAA tournament. He was inducted into the Philadelphia Big 5 Hall of Fame in 1995 and the La Salle Hall of Athletes in 1997.

NBA career

Legler went undrafted in the 1988 NBA draft and went to play basketball in Europe. After playing a few seasons in Europe, he came back to the United States and played in the Continental Basketball Association (CBA) with the Omaha Racers. He led Omaha to a CBA championship while leading the league in scoring.

Legler played in the NBA at the shooting guard position from 1989 to 2000. He is probably known most as a player in Washington, where he played four seasons (two with the Washington Bullets and two with the renamed Washington Wizards) from 1995 to 1999. His best NBA season was in 1995–96, when he ranked first in the league in both three-point field goal percentage and true shooting percentage, ranked second in turnover ratio, and won the 1996 Three-Point Shootout during All-Star Weekend. He holds the record for a 3-round aggregate of (23, 22 and 20 out of 30 each) 65 points (out of 90).

Legler was well known as an accurate three-point shooter and made 260 of his 604 attempts from that range in his career, an accuracy of 43 percent. This figure ranks fifth on the all-time list, behind only Steve Kerr, Hubert Davis, Dražen Petrović, and Stephen Curry. Legler also played for the Phoenix Suns, Denver Nuggets, Utah Jazz, Dallas Mavericks, and Golden State Warriors. His career ended due to a recurring knee problem. During his 10 seasons in the league, Legler made a little over $5.1 million in salary.

Legler was one of three NBA players to finish a season shooting better than 50 percent from the field, better than 50 percent from the three-point line, and better than 80 percent from the free-throw line (the others were Steve Kerr and Detlef Schrempf).

Post-NBA career
Legler currently appears regularly on the ESPN programs NBA Shootaround, NBA Fastbreak, First Take and NBA Coast to Coast, and he is a basketball analyst on SportsCenter and various shows on ESPN Radio. He has worked at the network since 1999.

Legler was considered a front-runner for the vacant La Salle head coaching job in 2018, but the position was ultimately given to Ashley Howard.

Personal life
Legler also attended John Randolph Tucker High School in Henrico County, Virginia and St. Mary's Catholic School in Richmond, Virginia. In 2002, he earned an MBA from the Wharton School at the University of Pennsylvania. He is married to Christina (Fuller) who is a former Philadelphia Eagles Cheerleader. Legler has two children with his ex-wife Jennifer and resides in the Philadelphia area.

Career statistics

NBA

Source

Regular season

|-
| style="text-align:left;"| 
| style="text-align:left;"| Phoenix
| 11 || 0 || 7.5 || .379 || .000 || 1.000 || .7 || .5 || .2 || .0 || 2.5
|-
| style="text-align:left;"| 
| style="text-align:left;"| Denver
| 10 || 0 || 14.8 || .347 || .250 || .833 || 1.8 || 1.2 || .2 || .0 || 5.8
|-
| style="text-align:left;"| 
| style="text-align:left;"| Utah
| 3 || 0 || 1.7 || .333 || – || – || .3 || .0 || .0 || .0 || .7
|-
| style="text-align:left;"| 
| style="text-align:left;"| Dallas
| 30 || 0 || 21.0 || .437 || .338 || .803 || 1.9 || 1.5 || .8 || .2 || 9.6
|-
| style="text-align:left;"| 
| style="text-align:left;"| Dallas
| 79 || 0 || 16.7 || .438 || .374 || .840 || 1.6 || 1.5 || .7 || .2 || 8.3
|-
| style="text-align:left;"| 
| style="text-align:left;"| Golden State
| 24 || 0 || 15.5 || .522 || .520 || .882 || 1.7 || 1.1 || .5 || .0 || 7.3
|-
| style="text-align:left;"| 
| style="text-align:left;"| Washington
| 77 || 0 || 23.1 || .507 || style="background:#CFECEC; width:1em"|.522* || .863 || 1.8 || 1.8 || .6 || .2 || 9.4
|-
| style="text-align:left;"| 
| style="text-align:left;"| Washington
| 15 || 0 || 12.1 || .313 || .276 || .857 || 1.4 || .5 || .2 || .3 || 2.9
|-
| style="text-align:left;"| 
| style="text-align:left;"| Washington
| 8 || 0 || 9.5 || .158 || .000 || .750 || .5 || .4 || .1 || .0 || 1.1
|-
| style="text-align:left;"| 
| style="text-align:left;"| Washington
| 30 || 0 || 12.6 || .443 || .400 || .500 || 1.3 || .7 || .1 || .1 || 4.0
|-
| style="text-align:left;"| 
| style="text-align:left;"| Golden State
| 23 || 4 || 12.3 || .359 || .333 || .778 || 1.0 || 1.0 || .2 || .0 || 3.3
|- class="sortbottom"
| style="text-align:center;" colspan="2"| Career
| 310 || 4 || 16.9 || .447 || .431 || .840 || 1.6 || 1.3 || .5 || .1 || 7.0

Playoffs

|-
| style="text-align:left;"| 1997
| style="text-align:left;"| Washington
| 3 || 0 || 6.3 || .000 || .000 || .500 || .3 || .7 || .0 || .0 || .3

References

External links

 

1966 births
Living people
American expatriate basketball people in France
American men's basketball players
Basketball players from Washington, D.C.
Dallas Mavericks players
Denver Nuggets players
Disney people
ESPN people
Golden State Warriors players
La Salle Explorers men's basketball players
Limoges CSP players
National Basketball Association broadcasters
Omaha Racers players
Phoenix Suns players
Rochester Flyers players
Shooting guards
Basketball players from Richmond, Virginia
Undrafted National Basketball Association players
Utah Jazz players
Washington Bullets players
Washington Wizards players
Wharton School of the University of Pennsylvania alumni